The Southern Railway Ps-4 was a class of 4-6-2 steam locomotives built for the Southern Railway, as well as its subsidiaries, the Alabama Great Southern Railroad and the Cincinnati, New Orleans and Texas Pacific Railway. The locomotives were notable for their green with gold trim liveries, and have been regarded by Smithsonian curator John H. White Jr. as being "among the most celebrated passenger locomotives operated in the United States...."

History

Development
During the 1920s, the Southern Railway's (SOU) roster consisted of smaller P-1, Ps-2, Ps-3, and P-5 class 4-6-2 Pacifics that could not handle the longer and heavier main line passenger trains between Washington D.C. and Atlanta. The SOU ordered the more powerful Ps-4 Heavy Pacific class with the first batches built between 1923 and 1924 by the American Locomotive Company's Schenectady Works in Schenectady, New York, with 27 of them delivered to the Southern, numbered 1366-1392; as well as five for the Cincinnati, New Orleans and Texas Pacific, numbered 6471-6475; and four for the Alabama Great Southern, numbered 6684-6687. These locomotives were derived from the standard USRA Heavy Pacific design, but had notable differences based on the Southern's needs. The Ps-4s had a more spacious cab, smaller 73 in (1,778 mm) driving wheels, a slightly shorter boiler, an additional firebox combustion chamber, and a Worthington 3-B feedwater heater.

Design and appearances

In 1925, Southern Railway president Fairfax Harrison traveled to the United Kingdom, where he admired the country's London and North Eastern Railway's apple green passenger steam locomotives. In 1926, Harrison's trip had inspired the appearance of the second order of Ps-4s built by ALCO's Richmond Works by having them painted in Virginian green with gold leaf trimming and lettering.

This order consisted of eleven locomotives for the Southern, numbered 1393-1409; seven for the Cincinnati, New Orleans and Texas Pacific, numbered 6476-6482; and four for the Alabama Great Southern, numbered 6688-6691. Aside from the paint scheme, which would soon be applied to all of Southern's passenger locomotives, the second order had other notable differences. They featured an Elesco feedwater heater rather than the Worthington heaters of the previous order, with the former placed on top of the smokebox between the stack and bell instead of under the running boards as the latter were placed. The second order also had larger tenders better suited for long-distance passenger runs, with three-axle bogies and 14,000-gallon water capacity, compared to the two-axle bogie, 10,000-gallon standard USRA tender design of the first order.

Because of the 1926 Ps-4s' glamorous Virginian green and gold paint scheme, they were signified as the "first ladies of the Pacifics" around the SOU system. The SOU engineers, firemen, and workshop employees decorated the Ps-4s with two brass flag holders on their headlight, a brass eagle ornament mounted in front of their smokebox door, and brass stars on their cylinder head caps.

The final Ps-4s were built in 1928 by the Baldwin Locomotive Works, consisting of only five locomotives for the Southern, numbered 1405-1409. They were equipped with smaller tenders unlike the second order, but still larger than those of the first order, featuring two-axle bogies and a capacity of 12,000-gallon of water. They also built with Walschaerts valve gear as opposed to the previous orders which were equipped with Baker valve gear. The final locomotive of the series, No. 1409, featured an extended smokebox and a Coffin feedwater heater. This heater was fitted on an experimental basis and was later removed in favor of the Worthington heaters used in the first order.

Nos. 1366-1404, 6471-6482 and 6684-6691 were eventually reequipped with Walschaerts valve gear in the mid to late 1930s. Additionally, all of the Ps-4s were reequipped with multiple-bearing crossheads as opposed to their original alligator crossheads. In the 1940s, Nos. 1366-1409 were all rebuilt with the higher and straighter front running board to allow more room around their cylinders and running gear for the crew to maintain the mechanical lubricating system.

In 1941, No. 1380 was given bullet-nose streamlining designed by Otto Kuhler for use on the railway's Tennessean service, which operated between Washington, DC, and Monroe, Virginia, connecting in the latter to the Norfolk and Western Railway, who had assigned its streamlined J class engines to its connecting lines. When the Tennessean was dieselized, No. 1380 joined the remainder of the Ps-4s assigned elsewhere on other express trains until it retired in 1953, though it retained its streamlining.

Revenue service and preservation

The Ps-4 locomotives were assigned to many of the Southern's most famous passenger trains, including the Crescent Limited, the Piedmont Limited, the Aiken-Augusta Special, and the Birmingham Special. The Cincinnati, New Orleans and Texas Pacific assigned the engines to their Royal Palm, Ponce de Leon, Queen & Crescent, and Florida Sunbeam trains, among others.

In 1941, the Southern system began to dieselize, but due to the onset of World War II, the railroad was unable to purchase additional diesel locomotives, and opted to retained their Ps-4s for the duration of the war. After the war ended, the railroad resumed dieselization and by the mid 1950s, all of the Ps-4s were retired and scrapped with the exception of one.

No. 1401 of the 1926 order was salvaged from the scrap line in 1952, per advice from railfan Walter H. Thrall and SOU board member W. Graham Claytor Jr., who requested that the locomotive should be donated to the Smithsonian Institution in Washington, D.C. In 1961, the No. 1401 locomotive was cosmetically restored and transported via flatbed truck to the Smithsonian's under construction National Museum of American History, which opened in early 1964. No. 1401 currently remains on static display at the museum as the sole survivor of the Southern Railway Ps-4.

See also
Atlanta and West Point 290

Notes

References

Bibliography

Further reading

External links

Steam Locomotive, Southern Railway 1401

Steam locomotives of Southern Railway (U.S.)
4-6-2 locomotives
ALCO locomotives
Baldwin locomotives
Steam locomotives of the United States
Railway locomotives introduced in 1923
Standard gauge locomotives of the United States
Preserved steam locomotives of Washington, D.C.